Wilson Smith (6 September 1841 – 22 February 1901) was a corporal of the United States Army who was awarded the Medal of Honor for gallantry during the American Civil War. He was awarded the medal on 24 April 1896 for actions performed in 1862 during the prelude to the Battle of Washington in North Carolina.

Personal life 
Smith was born on 6 September 1841 in either Madison or Oriskany Falls, New York. After being discharged from the Army, he worked in a casket factory in Oneida, New York, and served as a county supervisor in Rome, New York. He died on 22 February 1901 in Rome and was buried in Rome Cemetery.

Military service 
Smith enlisted in the Army on 4 October 1861 as a private and was assigned to Battery H of the 3rd New York Light Artillery. He was promoted to corporal on 9 January 1862 and to sergeant on 12 September 1862. On 6 September 1862, during a Confederate attack on the Union-held Washington, North Carolina, Smith took command of an isolated gun, and, while under heavy fire and in hand-to-hand combat, returned 15 rounds of fire at and scattered the Confederate line while sustaining heavy injuries. Due to injuries sustained in this engagement, his leg was later amputated above the knee. His actions helped prevent the Confederates from taking the town and led to his Medal of Honor nomination.

Smith later described his actions in writing:

Wilson was discharged for wounds on 1 February 1863 at Utica, New York. His Medal of Honor citation reads:

References 

United States Army Medal of Honor recipients
American Civil War recipients of the Medal of Honor
1841 births
1901 deaths
People from Madison, New York